The 14th FINA World Junior Synchronised Swimming Championships was held July 30-August 3, 2014 in Helsinki, Finland. The synchronised swimmers are aged between 15 and 18 years old, from 34 nations, swimming in four events: Solo, Duet, Team and Free combination.

Participating nations
34 nations swam at the 2014 World Junior Championships were:

Results

References

FINA World Junior Synchronised Swimming Championships
2014 in synchronized swimming
Swimming
Jun
International aquatics competitions hosted by Finland
Synchronised swimming in Finland